Hemphill, also known as Jackhorn, is an unincorporated community in Letcher County, Kentucky. The community has a post office with ZIP code 41825, which uses the Jackhorn name.

References

Unincorporated communities in Letcher County, Kentucky
Unincorporated communities in Kentucky